Hofland is a Dutch toponymic surname. Notable people with the surname include:

Barbara Hofland (1770–1844), English writer
Diego Hofland (born 1990), Dutch ice hockey player
Henk Hofland (1927–2016), Dutch journalist, columnist and writer
Kevin Hofland (born 1979), Dutch footballer
Mona Hofland (1929–2010), Norwegian actress
Moreno Hofland (born 1991), Dutch cyclist
Thomas Christopher Hofland (1777–1843), English artist and teacher
Tineke Hofland (born 1954), Dutch swimmer

See also
Hoffland, village in Norway
Hoffland, Nebraska, unincorporated community

References

Dutch-language surnames
Dutch toponymic surnames